Rules of the road  may refer to:

Transportation
Rules of the Road (Ireland), the official road safety manual for Ireland
Rules of the road in China
International Regulations for Preventing Collisions at Sea

Arts and entertainment
Rules of the Road (Anita O'Day album), 1993
Rules of the Road (Lee Kernaghan album), 2000 album
Rules of the Road, a 1993 documentary film by Oliver Herbrich
Rules of the Road, a 1993 short film by Su Friedrich

See also
Rule of the road (disambiguation)
Australian Road Rules
Road Rules (TV series)